The Diocese of Gyula (also  or ) is the Romanian Orthodox diocese of the Romanians in Hungary.

History
The diocese was established in 1999 for the Romanian minority of Hungary, forming part of the Metropolis of Banat. Gyula ( or ), a Hungarian town near the Hungary–Romania border, was chosen as the administrative center. The first bishop, Sofronie Drincec, served from 21 February 1999 to 25 February 2007, later serving in the Diocese of Oradea in Romania. The second and current bishop is Siluan Mănuilă, in charge since 8 July 2007. The diocese was withdrawn from the Metropolis of Banat in 2009 to be directly subordinate to the Patriarch of All Romania. In 2010, the diocese had 19 parishes and two monasteries in which 15 priests worked.

References

Gyula, Hungary
Gyula
Romanian Orthodox Church in Hungary
Christian organizations established in 1999
1999 establishments in Hungary
Romanians in Hungary